
Richard Kroner (8 March 1884 in Breslau – 2 November 1974 in Mammern) was a German neo-Hegelian philosopher, known for his Von Kant bis Hegel (1921/4), a classic history of German idealism written from the neo-Hegelian point of view. He was a Christian, from a Jewish background. He is known for his formulation of Hegel as 'the Protestant Aquinas'.

His Jewish ancestry led him to be 'suspended' (dismissed) under Nazi legislation in 1934, from his university position at Kiel. He was replaced briefly by Hans-Georg Gadamer, a personal friend.

The American philosopher Otis Lee studied with Kroner for the academic year 1933–1934 and helped him escape to the United States and find a new academic position at Manhattan's Union Theological Seminary.

Kroner's ideas on Hegel, including his slant from Kierkegaard, were taken up by some existentialist thinkers, including Lev Shestov and Nikolai Berdyaev.

Works
Zweck und Gesetz in der Biologie. Eine logische Untersuchung (1913)
Kants Weltanschauung (1914)
Hegel. Zum 100. Todestag (1932)
Die Selbstverwirklichung des Geistes. Prolegomena zur Kulturphilosophie (1928)
Von Kant bis Hegel.
1. Band: Von der Vernunftkritik zur Naturphilosophie (1921)
2. Band: Von der Naturphilosophie zur Philosophie des Geistes (1924)
Speculation in pre-Christian philosophy (1957)
Selbstbesinnung. Drei Lehrstunden (1958)
Speculation and Revelation In Modern Philosophy (1961)
Between Faith and Thought: Reflections and Suggestions (1966)
Freiheit und Gnade (1969)

References

On Two Books by Richard Kroner (1930) - Lev Shestov
Richard Kroner (1884-1974). Ein christlicher Philosoph jüdischer Herkunft unter dem Schatten Hitlers (1993) - Walter Asmus

External links
Kant's Weltanschauung on archive.org
The Primary Of Faith on archive.org
Richard Kroner : Von Kant bis Hegel
On Christianity Early Theological Writings by  Hegel --INTRODUCTION : HEGEL'S Philosophical Development By RICHARD KRONER on archive.org
Von Kant bis Hegel (2 Vols) on archive.org

1884 births
1974 deaths
German male writers
20th-century German philosophers
Columbia University faculty